Blairfindy Castle is an L-plan tower house, dating from the 16th century, around  north of Tomintoul, and west of the River Livet.   The tower was a hunting seat of  the earls of Huntly.

The building is derelict. However, in 2019, a project to stabilise and make the castle safe was completed. Complete with a new access path and disabled parking alongside an information board, visitors can go inside the castle ruins on a free flow basis.

History

The first owners of Blairfindy were Grants, but the present castle was built by the Gordons,  having been completed by John Gordon in 1564. It was after it passed to another branch of the family in 1586 that it became a hunting seat for the Huntly earls.

It is close to the site of the Battle of Glenlivet where the Earl of Argyll’s Protestant army was defeated by the much smaller army of the Earl of Huntly and the Francis Hay, 9th Earl of Erroll, in 1594.

Structure

Although the castle is broadly L-plan, its wing projects slightly to allow defence of both sides.  A corbelled angle turret arose on the other side.

In the re-entrant angle is the arched entrance doorway.  Above, for its defence, is a heavily corbelled projection, with machicolations to allow missiles to be dropped, while to the side there is a shot hole.  On a panel above the doorway are the quartered arms of the Gordons, with the date 1586 and the initials I.G. and H.G.  A semicircular stair tower rises above the doorway in the re-entrant angle.

It has been argued that in a tower house of this relatively late date the machicolation was a deliberately archaic addition which gave a warlike appearance to what was essentially a residential building.

The basement is vaulted. At the north of the block is the kitchen, which has an oven, a large fireplace, and water drain. To the south of the mural stair up to the hall is a wine cellar.

The whole of the first floor was used for the hall, which was clearly a fine room; some panelling and a carved fireplace remain.  There were bedrooms above.

There are numerous windows and shot holes.

It is a category B listed building.

References

Castles in Moray
Listed castles in Scotland